The National Assembly of the Gambia is the unicameral legislature of the Gambia. The authorisation for the National Assembly lies in Chapter VII of the Constitution of the Gambia. It is composed of 53 members directly elected through first past the post, and a further five members appointed by the President.

Composition and electoral system 
The National Assembly is unicameral and consists of 58 members who serve a five-year term. 53 members are directly elected while the remaining five are appointed by the President. Members are elected in single-member constituencies using the simple majority, or first-past-the-post system.

History 
Legislative representation based on universal adult suffrage in the Gambia began in May 1962, when elections were held for a 32-seat House of Representatives. These elections were won by the People's Progressive Party (PPP), which was led by Dawda Jawara. After independence in 1965, the PPP continued to dominate the House of Representatives by winning a series of free, democratic elections in 1966, 1972, 1977, 1982, 1987, and 1992. While opposition parties were continuously present in the House, they were never able to successfully wrest power from the PPP. Jawara's government was overthrown in a July 1994 military coup led by Yahya Jammeh. The constitution and all elected institutions, including the House of Representatives, were dissolved. After the coup, political party activities were banned. The ban was lifted in August 1996 following the approval of a new constitution, but three Jawara-era parties – the PPP, Gambian People's Party (GPP), and the National Convention Party (NCP) remained proscribed.

Legislative elections to the renamed National Assembly took place on 2 January 1997. Jammeh's Alliance for Patriotic Reorientation and Construction (APRC) won 33 out of 45 seats, the opposition United Democratic Party (UDP) won 7, two went to both the National Reconciliation Party (NRP) and Independents, with the People's Democratic Organization for Independence and Socialism (PDOIS) winning the remaining seat.

The  (IEC) lifted the ban on the PPP, GPP, and NCP in August 2001, five months before the next scheduled legislative election.

On April 7, 2017, the IEC announced that UDP had won a majority of 31 seats out of 53 available during the 2017 legislative elections.

On 17 April 2022, the sixth legislature was sworn in after the 2022 elections, NPP's electoral alliance with the APRC and with NRP gave the pro-government bloc a majority, with 29 seats.

Leadership 
The current leadership of the National Assembly is as follows: APRC leader Fabakary Jatta as assembly speaker, Seedy Njieh as deputy speaker, Billay Tunkara as majority leader and UDP leader Ousainou Darboe as minority leader. The Speaker and Deputy Speaker may only be chosen from among the presidential appointees to the National Assembly, not the elected members. Speakers of the National Assembly are considered impartial presiding officers, although they may cast tie-breaking votes.

Notes
 Independents are listed as part of the opposition by default.

See also 
 History of the Gambia
 Politics of the Gambia
 List of speakers of the National Assembly of the Gambia

References

External links
 

Government of the Gambia
Politics of the Gambia
Political organisations based in the Gambia
Gambia, The
Gambia